Haverty is a surname. Notable people with the surname include:

 J. J. Haverty (1858–1939), American businessman and art collector 
 Joe Haverty, Irish footballer
 Joseph Patrick Haverty (1794–1864), Irish painter
 Martin Haverty (1809–1887), Irish journalist and historian
 Michael Haverty (born 1961), Irish hurler and referee
 Mike Haverty (born 1944), American railroad executive

See also
 Havertys, American furniture retailer